Troublesome Night 15 is a 2002 Hong Kong horror comedy film produced by Nam Yin and directed by Jamie Luk. It is the 15th of the 20 films in the Troublesome Night film series.

Plot
Ngau's grandfather was a hanjian during the Second Sino-Japanese War; he murdered Keung and Keung's family. Keung became a vengeful ghost after death, seeking revenge on the Ngau family. Ngau's wife was killed by Keung's ghost shortly after giving birth to their son, Fai. Ngau is afraid of losing Fai so he asks Mrs Bud Lung, an expert ghostbuster, to help him. She suggests that he operates a food stall at night to attract some ghost patrons and ask them to protect his family from Keung. When Fai grows up, he gets seduced by Sally, who tries to trick him into selling his father's land. If the land is sold, Ngau will lose ownership of the food stall and the ghost patrons can no longer protect his family. Fai knocks his father unconscious, steals his seal and signs a contract with Sally to sell the land – only to realise that she has deceived him. Although Ngau's friends manage to destroy the contract later, it is too late as Keung has already caused Fai to die in a car accident. Out of love for his son, Ngau sacrifices himself to appease Keung, and Fai is brought back to life. In memory of his father, Fai and his wife continue to operate the food stall to serve ghost patrons.

Cast
 Eric Tsang as Ngau
 Edmond Leung as Fai
 Law Lan as Mrs Bud Lung
 Iris Wong as Sally Li
 Benny Lai as Keung
 Kei-kei as Fa
 Tong Ka-fai as Bud Gay
 Ronnie Cheung as Bud Yan
 Anita Chan as Audrey
 Mr Nine as Lai Chor-kau
 Onitsuka as Lai Chor-pat
 Ricky Yi as Sally's boyfriend
 Kitty Chung as Ngau's wife
 Benny Law as friendly ghost
 Tam Kon-chung as gangster
 Jeff Kam as Japanese soldier
 Big Cheong as taxi driver
 Lee Ting-fung as Fai (young)

External links
 
 

Hong Kong comedy horror films
2000s Cantonese-language films
2002 comedy horror films
2002 films
Troublesome Night (film series)
2000s Hong Kong films